Allan Frederick Lawrence,  (November 8, 1925 – September 6, 2008) was a Canadian politician and served as both a provincial and federal cabinet minister.

Provincial politics
After practicing as a lawyer, Lawrence became a member of the Legislative Assembly of Ontario. His membership started when he won a 1958 provincial by-election in the downtown Toronto riding of St. George for the Progressive Conservative Party of Ontario. In 1968, Premier John Robarts brought him into cabinet as Minister of Mines.

He ran to succeed Robarts as party leader at the 1971 leadership convention. Lawrence lost to Bill Davis by 44 votes on the fourth ballot. Davis reunited the party by inviting many of Lawrence's key workers, including Hugh Segal and Norman K. Atkins, onto his team to create the Big Blue Machine that helped the party remain in power for a further 14 years.

Davis appointed Lawrence as his Attorney-General in 1971. In 1972, Lawrence resigned his seat in the Ontario legislature to enter federal politics.

Cabinet positions

Federal politics
Lawrence was elected to the House of Commons of Canada in the 1972 federal election as the Progressive Conservative Member of Parliament (MP) for the rural Ontario riding of Northumberland—Durham. He served as an MP throughout the decade.

When the party won the 1979 federal election, Prime Minister Joe Clark appointed Lawrence to the Cabinet as Minister of Consumer and Corporate Affairs and Solicitor-General. The Clark government fell in a motion of no confidence after several months and was defeated in the 1980 election. Lawrence was re-elected in his riding and returned to the opposition benches.

He ran again in the 1984 election but, despite the Conservative victory that year, was passed over for a cabinet appointment by Brian Mulroney. Lawrence retired from politics at the 1988 election.

Later life
Lawrence retired to the small town of Cobourg, Ontario, with his wife, Moira. He died on September 6, 2008, at Mount Sinai Hospital in Toronto. He was 82 years old.

References

External links

1925 births
2008 deaths
Attorneys General of Ontario
Canadian King's Counsel
Lawyers in Ontario
Members of the 21st Canadian Ministry
Members of the Executive Council of Ontario
Members of the King's Privy Council for Canada
Members of the House of Commons of Canada from Ontario
Politicians from Toronto
Progressive Conservative Party of Canada MPs
Progressive Conservative Party of Ontario MPPs
Solicitors General of Canada